Marco Aurelio Alvarotti (born Padua - died in the 15th century) was an Italian comedian.

He was a friend and companion of Ruzante and played in his comedies but popularly known as Menato.

References 

Italian comedians
15th-century deaths
Actors from Padua
15th-century Italian actors